Ron Kravette (born June 17, 1963) is a retired American ice dancer. With partner Suzanne Semanick, he won the bronze medal at the United States Figure Skating Championships in 1989 and 1990. After skating with [[Elizabeth McLean]4th in the US in 1991] for a time, he teamed with Amy Webster, and they were national bronze medalists in 1994 and 1995, and 4th in the US in 1993 and 1997. They were 1st at the US Olympic Festival in 1993. Kravette also previously skated with partner Colette Huber.They were US Junior Dance champions in 1986. Ron has an AA from Orange Coast College (1983), a BA in History from the University of California, Irvine (1986), an MA in Government from Harvard University (2006), and is currently a PhD candidate in Global Studies at the University of Massachusetts, Lowell.   

Ron's sister, Aimee Kravette, was also a competitive figure skater.

More recently, Kravette is a skating coach and history teacher at a community college.  He had a book, entitled Collapse: 
How the Fall of the Soviet Union Changed Figure Skating in the United States and the World, published in 2011. He has been a 5-year member of the US Figure Skating's Board of Directors, a US National Technical Specialist in ice dance, and was awarded the Professional Skating Association's (PSA) Presidential Award of Excellence for coaching in 2020 and 2021.

Competitive highlights 
GP: Champions Series (Grand Prix)

With Webster

With McLean

With Semanick

With Huber

References

American male ice dancers
1963 births
Living people
University of California, Irvine alumni
Harvard Graduate School of Arts and Sciences alumni
University of Massachusetts Lowell alumni